Djibouti (Arabic: جيبوتي  Jībūtī, Somali: Jabuuti), officially the Republic of Djibouti, is a country in the Horn of Africa. It is bordered by Eritrea in the north, Ethiopia in the west and south, and Somalia in the southeast. The remainder of the border is formed by the Red Sea and the Gulf of Aden.

Secret police organizations
Brigade Spéciale de Recherche de la Gendarmerie (Gendarmerie Special Research Brigade)
Service de Documentation et de Sedimentation (SDS) (Documentation and Security Service, meanly faded into the population; they have agent anywhere that could be imagined, and take their source of power in their attendance.)

Sources
 Das, Dilip K.; Palmiotto, Michael (2004). World Police Encyclopedia. Taylor & Francis. 
 Kurian, George Thomas (2006). World Encyclopedia of Police Forces and Correctional Systems (2nd ed.). Thomson Gale. 
 Sullivan, Larry E. (2005). Encyclopedia of Law Enforcement: International. Thousand Oaks: Sage Publications.